Char... The No-Man's Island is a 2012 documentary film directed by Sourav Sarangi. The documentary is a co-production by India, Japan, Norway, Italy and England. The film was shown in the Berlin Film Festival.

Synopsis 
The film revolves around Rubel, a young boy who wants to attend school, but whose financial circumstances force him to become a smuggler from India to Bangladesh.  Every day, he has to cross a river that forms the border between the two countries.  He stays at an island named Char which is a no-man's land and is patrolled by the border security force of both countries.

References

External links 
 
 

Documentary films about India
2012 films
2012 documentary films
Bengali-language Indian films
Documentary films about children